Knudsen may refer to:

People
Knudsen is a surname of Scandinavian origin, derived from the personal name Knud (Canute) and literally meaning "Knud's son." Notable people with the surname include:
Anthony Carl Knudsen (1874–1931), American businessman and politician
Gitte Moos Knudsen, Danish neurobiologist and neurologist
Gunnar Knudsen (1848–1928), Prime Minister of Norway 1908–1910 and 1913–1920
Jens Martin Knudsen (1930–2005), Danish astrophysicist
Jens Martin Knudsen (born 1967), Faroese goalkeeper
Jesper Knudsen (badminton) (born 1960), Danish player
Karen Knudsen, American oncology researcher
Keith Knudsen (1948–2005), American musician, member of The Doobie Brothers
Knud Knudsen (linguist) (1812–1895), Norwegian linguist
Konrad Knudsen (1890–1959), Norwegian painter, journalist, and parliamentarian
Lars Knudsen (born 1962), Danish researcher in cryptography
Martin Knudsen (1871–1949), Danish physicist
Morten Knudsen, (born 1995) Danish footballer
Per Holm Knudsen (contemporary), Danish author
Eugene Peter Knudsen (1915-1981), American farmer and politician
Semon "Bunkie" Knudsen (1912–1998), American automobile industry executive
Sidse Babett Knudsen (born 1968), Danish actress
Tord Øverland Knudsen (born 1982), Norwegian musician
Valdemar Knudsen (1819–1898), Norwegian-American sugar planter on Hawaii, entrepreneur
Vern Oliver Knudsen, (1893–1974), American acoustical physicist
William S. Knudsen (1879–1948), Danish American automobile industry executive, US Army General

Other uses 
Knudsen, a brand of dairy products, currently owned by Kraft Foods
R.W. Knudsen Family, a brand of natural bottled juices, currently owned by The J.M. Smucker Company
Knudsen gas, scientific model for gases
Knudsen number, dimensionless number
Knudsen layer, layer between liquid and vapour

See also
Knutsen

Danish-language surnames
Norwegian-language surnames
Patronymic surnames
Surnames from given names